Harri Tudor Rhys (died September 1947) was a British Labour Party politician.

Rhys became active in the Labour Party in Wood Green in the mid-1900s.  He was elected to the council, and stood as a candidate in Wood Green at the 1918, 1922 and 1924 United Kingdom general elections, taking second place on each occasion, but never coming close to election.  He remained on the council until his death, in 1947.

References

Year of birth missing
1947 deaths
Labour Party (UK) councillors
Labour Party (UK) parliamentary candidates
Mayors of places in Greater London
People from Wood Green